

Events

January events 
 January 28 - Sofia Metro Line 1 entered into service.

February events
 February 11- The Illinois Central Railroad was purchased by the Canadian National Railway but maintained independent operations for the next seventeen months before being integrated into the CN.
 February 14 – Yaoundé train explosion – A freight train passing through Yaoundé, Cameroon, collides with another freight; some tank cars carrying fuel oil are ruptured in the derailment.  The oil is ignited by a lit cigarette causing a flash fire and an explosion when the flames reach the tank cars, killing 120 people.
 February 20 – The Dakota, Minnesota and Eastern Railroad files an application with the Surface Transportation Board to build new railroad track to haul coal from the Powder River Basin in Wyoming.

March events 
 March 6 – The Jyväskylä rail accident occurred in Jyväskylä, Finland, when an express train from Turku bound for Joensuu via Pieksämäki derailed. Of the 300 on board, the driver and nine passengers were killed, and 94 were injured.

April events 
 April 1 – British trainload freight operator EWS takes over rail operations of National Power.
 April 4 – The Fatuha train crash in India was caused by the removal of fishplates leading to the packed Howrah–Danapur express jumping tracks, killing at least 11 people.
 April 27 – Spain's Madrid Metro opens the section between Esperanza and Mar de Cristal on Line 4.

June events
 June 3 – The Eschede train disaster, the worst railroad accident in German history, occurs when a wheel on the high-speed IntercityExpress breaks; the derailed train's forward momentum caused it to slam into a bridge pier which increased the damage to the train and caused a higher injury toll than would otherwise have occurred.
 June 6 – The majority of Conrail's railroad assets are split between CSX Transportation and Norfolk Southern.
 June 19 – The government of Panama relinquishes control of the Panama Railway to the Panama Canal Railway Company, a subsidiary of Kansas City Southern.
 June 23 – Road-rail (dual gauge) Jamuna Bridge opened, connecting the previously isolated east and west networks of Bangladesh Railway.

July events

August events

September events
 September 12 – The Westside Line of Portland's MAX light rail system, running west to Hillsboro, Oregon, opens.
 September – Construction begins to convert the Anton Anderson Memorial Tunnel in Alaska from rail traffic only to combined rail and highway traffic.

October events
 October 8 – Norway's first high-speed railway, Gardermobanen between Oslo S via Oslo Airport, Gardermoen to Eidsvoll, opens.
 October 15 – Paris Métro opens first section of new Line 14 from Madeleine to Bibliothèque François Mitterrand, Paris, France, its first fully automated line.
 October 18 – The Altamont Commuter Express begins regional commuter rail service between Stockton in California's Central Valley and San Jose in the San Francisco Bay Area.

November events 
 November 9 – The St. Thomas and Eastern Railway begins operations on a former Canadian National Railway branch line between St. Thomas and Delhi, Ontario.
 November 20 – The Okanagan Valley Railway begins operations on the former Canadian Pacific Railway branch between Sicamous and Kelowna, British Columbia.
 November 26 – The Khanna rail disaster in India kills 212 people.

December events
 December – Railways in Germany are attacked by the extortionist Klaus-Peter Sabotta.  An Intercity Express line is sabotaged (but the train does not derail), while a freight train is derailed near Anklam.
 December 5 – Trinity Railway Express in Texas adds Saturday train schedules to its timetables and begins operating the first regular Saturday trains.
 December 10 – The Surface Transportation Board gives preliminary approval to Dakota, Minnesota and Eastern Railroad's application to build into the Powder River Basin, pending completion of an Environmental Impact Statement.
This is the line's last expansion until 2016.

Unknown date events
 The former Lima Locomotive Works erecting shed and heavy Shay locomotive shops are razed.

Accidents
 May 12 – A Norfolk Southern conductor saved a little girl by kicking her off the tracks in front on his oncoming train while he was still on it in Lafayette, Indiana. The girl, who had wandered away from her home a couple blocks away, had only minor injuries.

Deaths

September deaths 
 September 9 – James B. McCahey, Jr., president of Chicago South Shore and South Bend Railroad (b. 1920).

Awards

North America 
1998 E. H. Harriman Awards

Awards presented by Railway Age magazine
 1998 Railroader of the Year: David R. Goode (NS)
 1998 Regional Railroad of the Year: Texas Mexican Railway
 1998 Short Line Railroad of the Year: St. Lawrence and Atlantic Railroad

References 

Notes
 Colin Churcher's Railway Pages (August 16, 2005). Retrieved November 8 and November 20, 2005.